Abdul Kuddus Makhan (1 July 1947 - 10 February 1994) was a Bangladesh Awami League politician and the former Member of Parliament of Comilla-5.

Early life 
Makhan was born on 1 July 1947 in Brahmanbaria, East Bengal, British India. He studied at Brahmanbaria College and Dhaka University. He was a leader of the Six point movement.

Career
Makhan served in the Jubo League as a Presidium Member. He was elected to parliament from Comilla-5 as a Bangladesh Awami League candidate in 1973. From 1992 to 1994 he was a member of the Awami League central working committee.

Death 
Makhan died on 10 February 1994.

References

Awami League politicians
1994 deaths
1st Jatiya Sangsad members
1947 births
University of Dhaka alumni